Eugene Reybold (February 13, 1884 – November 21, 1961) was distinguished as the World War II Chief of Engineers who directed the largest United States Army Corps of Engineers in the nation's history.

Reybold was born in Delaware City, Delaware. He graduated from Delaware College in 1903. Commissioned in the Coast Artillery Corps in 1908, Reybold was assigned to military housing and coast defense construction work. Stationed at Fort Monroe throughout World War I, he became commandant of the Coast Artillery School in 1919. He then transferred to the Corps of Engineers in 1926 and served as District Engineer in Buffalo, New York; Wilmington, North Carolina; and Memphis, Tennessee. In the last assignment he successfully battled record Mississippi River flood crests. He was appointed Southwestern Division Engineer (1937–40) and War Department Assistant Chief of Staff, G-4 (1940–41). Appointed Chief of Engineers shortly before Pearl Harbor, General Reybold directed the Corps' tremendous range of activities throughout the war and became the first Army officer ever to attain the rank of Lieutenant General while serving in the position of Chief of Engineers. 

General Reybold retired on January 31, 1946, and died November 21, 1961, in Washington, D.C. He was awarded a Distinguished Service Medal with Oak Leaf Cluster.

References
This article contains public domain text from

1884 births
1961 deaths
People from Delaware City, Delaware
United States Army generals
Recipients of the Distinguished Service Medal (US Army)
American military engineers
United States Army Corps of Engineers Chiefs of Engineers
United States Army personnel of World War I
United States Army generals of World War II